The 2012 Rushmoor Council elections took place on Thursday 3 May 2012 to elect members of Rushmoor Borough Council in Hampshire, England.

It was a very good night for the Labour Party and their Leader Cllr Keith Dibble who achieved the highest percentage vote on the night. Labour gained the three seats in the new Cherrywood ward in Farnborough. The first time Labour has had councillors in Farnborough for ten years.

The controlling Tories lost 5 seats, Labour gained 5, UKIP gained 1 and the Lib Dems lost all 4 seats.

The Tories had a reduced majority

The whole of the council was up for election following a boundary review that has reorganised the distribution of council wards throughout the borough. The council will now be composed of 13 wards, each of which will elect three members to create a council of 39 councillors.

Election result

Ward results

Aldershot

Cherrywood

Cove and Southwood

Empress

Fernhill

Knellwood

Manor Park

North Town

Rowhill

St John's

St Mark's

Wellington

West Heath

References

2012 English local elections
2012
2010s in Hampshire